Dieter Kuprella (born 5 February 1946) is a former German basketball player. He competed in the men's tournament at the 1972 Summer Olympics.

References

1946 births
Living people
Bayer Giants Leverkusen players
German men's basketball players
Olympic basketball players of West Germany
Basketball players at the 1972 Summer Olympics
Sportspeople from Gelsenkirchen